The Horse Legends is the twentieth album by American singer-songwriter Michael Martin Murphey. This is Murphey's tribute to the horse and contains a duet with Johnny Cash on "Tennessee Stud", cover versions of Dan Fogelberg's "Run for the Roses" and Gordon Lightfoot's "The Pony Man", and re-recordings of Murphey's "Wildfire" and "The Running Blood". The Horse Legends was the last album Murphey recorded for Warner Bros. Records.

Track listing

Credits
Music
 Michael Martin Murphey – vocals, producer
 Johnny Cash – vocals
 Biff Watson – acoustic guitar
 Larry Byrom – acoustic guitar
 Brent Mason – electric guitar
 Steve Gibson – electric guitar, producer
 Chris Leuzinger – 12-string guitar, acoustic guitar, electric guitar
 Mark Casstevens – 12-string guitar, acoustic guitar
 Sonny Garrish – steel guitar, dobro
 Mark Howard – banjo, acoustic guitar
 Hank Singer – fiddle, mandolin
 Matt Rollings – piano
 David Hoffner – piano, synthesizer
 Joey Miskulin – accordion, producer
 Michael Rhodes – electric bass
 Craig Nelson – acoustic bass, electric bass
 Mike Brignardello – bass
 Eddie Bayers – drums
 Tommy Wells – drums
 Jerry Kroon – drums
 Kenny Malone – percussion
 John Wesley Ryles – background vocals
 Lisa Silver – background vocals
 Harry Stinson – background vocals
 Gary Janney – background vocals
 Dan Keen – background vocals
 Curtis Young – background vocals
 Dennis Wilson – background vocals

Production
 Jim Ed Norman – producer
 Bob Tassi – engineer
 Rich Schirmer – engineer
 Marshall Morgan – engineer, mixing
 Toby Seay – engineer, mixing assistant
 Scott "T-Bone" Stillman – assistant engineer
 Tim Roberts – assistant engineer
 Fred Mercer – assistant engineer
 Bob Wright – assistant engineer
 Jim Eaton – assistant engineer
 Denny Purcell – mastering
 Don Cobb – editing

References

External links
 Michael Martin Murphey's Official Website

1997 albums
Michael Martin Murphey albums
Albums produced by Jim Ed Norman
Warner Records albums